Jeremy Hunter Roach (born November 1, 2001) is an American college basketball player for the Duke Blue Devils of the Atlantic Coast Conference (ACC).

High school career
As a freshman in 2016–17, Roach averaged 11.1 points to help lead his team to a 17–4 record and a runner-up finish in the WCAC. As a sophomore in 2017–18, Roach averaged 15.2 points to help his team to a 33–4 record, including 18–0 in the Washington Catholic Athletic Conference, and a VISAA championship. 

Roach would miss the rest of his junior season after he suffered a torn ACL during a scrimmage.

As a senior, he averaged 19.1 points, 6.3 rebounds, 2.8 assists and 1.9 steals per game and guided his school to the VISAA D-I State Championship.

Roach was selected to play in the McDonald's All-American Game, Jordan Brand Classic and Nike Hoop Summit, but all three games were canceled due to the COVID-19 pandemic.

Recruiting
Roach was a consensus five-star recruit and one of the best point guards in the 2020 class. On May 8, 2019, he committed to playing college basketball for Duke over offers from Kentucky, North Carolina, and Villanova.

National team career
Roach played for the United States national under-16 team at the 2017 FIBA Under-16 Americas Championship. Roach averaged 10.6 points, 1.4 rebounds, and 2.8 assists per game, helping his team win the gold medal.

Roach played for the United States national under-17 team at the 2018 FIBA Under-17 Basketball World Cup in Rosario and Santa Fe, Argentina. In seven games, he averaged 6.4 points and 2.7 assists per game, helping his team win the gold medal.

Career statistics

College

|-
| style="text-align:left;"| 2020–21
| style="text-align:left;"| Duke
| 24 || 18 || 27.4 || .453 || .310 || .675 || 2.2 || 2.8 || .8 || .0 || 8.7
|-
| style="text-align:left;"| 2021–22
| style="text-align:left;"| Duke
| 39 || 27 || 29.4 || .410 || .322 || .762 || 2.4 || 3.2 || .8 || .1 || 8.6
|-
| style="text-align:left;"| 2022–23
| style="text-align:left;"| Duke
| 30 || 28 || 33.0 || .420 || .341 || .770 || 2.5 || 3.1 || .9 || .0 || 13.3
|- class="sortbottom"
| style="text-align:center;" colspan="2"| Career
| 93 || 73 || 30.0 || .424 || .326 || .749 || 2.4 || 3.0 || .8 || .1 || 10.2

References

External links
Duke Blue Devils bio
ESPN profile
USA Basketball bio

2001 births
Living people
American men's basketball players
Basketball players from Virginia
Basketball players from Washington, D.C.
Duke Blue Devils men's basketball players
McDonald's High School All-Americans
People from Leesburg, Virginia
Point guards